Villani is an Italian surname. The surname can also be found in France. Notable people with the surname include:

Anna Villani (born 1966), Italian marathon runner
Carmen Villani (born 1944), former Italian pop singer
Cédric Villani, French mathematician and politician
Carlo "Charlie" Villani (born 1963), Australian former football (soccer) player
Elyse Villani (born 1989), Australian cricketer
Filippo Villani, Florentian chronicler
Giacomo Villani (1605–1690), Italian Roman Catholic prelate, bishop of Caiazzo
Giovanni Villani, Florentian banker, official, diplomat and chronicler
Jamian Juliano-Villani (born 1987), American painter
Matteo Villani (1283-1363), Italian historian
Matteo Villani (athlete) (born 1982), Italian steeplechase runner
Olga Villani, known as Olga Villi (1922–1989), Italian model and actress
Pat Villani (1954–2011), American computer programmer and author
Ralph A. Villani (1901–1974), American politician, mayor of Newark
Sofia Villani Scicolone, known as Sophia Loren (1934), Italian film actress and singer

See also 

 Vilani (disambiguation)

Italian-language surnames